12345 may refer to:

 The ZIP code exclusive to the General Electric plant in Schenectady, New York
 Saraighat Express, a superfast train in India with number 12345
 The year 12,345 in the 13th millennium AD